The men's 110 metres hurdles at the 2022 World Athletics Championships was held at the Hayward Field in Eugene on 16 and 17 July 2022.

Summary

Through the qualification process, all the key competitors qualified for the final.  Then warming up, Olympic Champion Hansle Parchment injured his right leg, suddenly he was lying on the infield getting treatment.  The athletes were called to the line but Parchment couldn't even walk to the line.  Moments after the gun was fired, a second gun recalling the race.  Officials looking at the computerized reaction times saw world leader, third fastest of all time, Devon Allen had a reaction time of .099, one one thousandth of a second faster than the allowable.  After protesting, the Oregon hometown star was disqualified.  As the six remaining athletes were called to the line a second time and the crowd was quieted, the word "bullshit" could be heard yelled from the stands before the set command.

With a legal start, defending champion Grant Holloway was off to a quick start, first over the first hurdle and a full metre ahead of the field except for U.S. Collegiate champion Trey Cunningham.  By the fifth hurdle, Holloway had over a metre on Cunningham, who hit that hurdle, while Damian Czykier began to emerge as the next chaser just ahead of Asier Martínez.  Shane Brathwaite hit the sixth hurdle and abandoned his attempt to clear the next.  Over the last two hurdles, Czykier lost a little ground while Martínez pulled ahead.  Still a metre back over the final hurdle, Cunningham closed and leaned to make the finish close.

Records
Before the competition records were as follows:

Qualification standard
The standard to qualify automatically for entry was 13.32.

Schedule
The event schedule, in local time (UTC−7), was as follows:

Results

Heats 

The first 4 athletes in each heat (Q) and the next 4 fastest (q) qualify to the semi-finals.

Wind:Heat 1: -0.5 m/s, Heat 2: +0.4 m/s, Heat 3: -0.3 m/s, Heat 4: +0.2 m/s, Heat 5: +0.4 m/s

Semi-finals 
The first 2 athletes in each heat (Q) and the next 2 fastest (q) qualify to the finals.
The semifinals was started on 17 July at 17:05.

Wind:Heat 1: -0.6 m/s, Heat 2: +0.3 m/s, Heat 3: +2.5 m/s

Final 
The final was started on 17 July at 19:30

References 

110 hurdles
Sprint hurdles at the World Athletics Championships